Michael Noonan (June 30, 1961) is a retired American soccer player who played professionally in the American Indoor Soccer Association and is currently the head coach of the Clemson University men's soccer team.

Playing career
Noonan attended Middlebury College, playing on the men's soccer team from 1979 to 1982.  He was a 1981 and 1982 Division III NCAA First Team All American.  Noonan played for the Louisville Thunder in the American Indoor Soccer Association.  In 1986, he signed with the Fort Wayne Flames where he spent two seasons.  In 2017, Noonan was inducted into the Middlebury College Athletics Hall of Fame for his playing time there.

Coaching career
In 1989, Noonan was hired as head coach of the Wheaton College men's soccer team.  The team had a 4–11–0 record his first season, but he took them to a 12–5–1 record his second season.  This led to a move to the University of New Hampshire where he coached from 1991 to 1994.  In 1995, he became head coach of the Brown University's men's soccer team.  Noonan compiled a 160–77–31  record with ten NCAA post-season tournament appearances in fifteen seasons with the Bears.  On January 5, 2010, Clemson University announced they had hired Noonan as head coach of the men's soccer team. Noonan enjoyed some success with the Tigers. In 2014, Noonan led the Tigers to ACC regular season and tournament titles.  In 2015 he led them to the College Cup Final, but ultimately lost to Stanford.  In 2016, Clemson finished runners up in the ACC Tournament and made it to the Quarterfinals of the NCAA tournament.  In 2017, Noonan obtained his 300th career coaching win in a game against South Carolina. This includes wins from his time as assistant coach. In 2021, he led Clemson to a NCAA National Championship in a 2–0 win over University of Washington.

Head coaching record

References

External links
 Clemson Tigers bio
 Brown Bears bio
 Middlebury Hall of Fame profile

1961 births
Living people
American soccer coaches
American soccer players
American Indoor Soccer Association players
Bates Bobcats men's soccer coaches
Brown Bears men's soccer coaches
Clemson Tigers men's soccer coaches
Fort Wayne Flames players
Louisville Thunder players
Middlebury Panthers men's soccer players
New Hampshire Wildcats men's soccer coaches
Wheaton Thunder men's soccer coaches
People from Westport, Connecticut
Soccer players from Connecticut
Association football midfielders
Association football defenders
Vermont Catamounts men's soccer coaches